Robert S. Ianello (born November 4, 1965) is an American football coach, serving as the General Manager with the Kansas Jayhawks. Ianello served as the head football coach at the University of Akron from 2010 to 2011, compiling a record of 2–22. He was fired after the 2011 season. He succeeded J. D. Brookhart, who was relieved of his duties after the 2009 season in which the Akron Zips went 3–9. Before he was hired at Akron, Ianello had been an assistant football coach since 1988, including stints at the University of Alabama, the University of Wisconsin, the University of Arizona, and the University of Notre Dame.

Assistant coach
For two years, Ianello was tight ends coach at the University of Wisconsin–Madison, when he then moved to the University of Notre Dame to be receivers coach and recruiting coordinator. Ianello briefly oversaw the Notre Dame football program after head coach Charlie Weis was fired and before Brian Kelly was hired.

Akron
In December 2009, Akron hired Ianello as football coach. He lost his first 11 games as a head coach before beating Buffalo in the final game of the 2010 season. His only other win as Akron's coach was a 36–13 defeat of VMI in 2011. Ianello was dismissed as Akron's head coach after just two seasons.

Personal life
Ianello is a native of Port Chester, New York and a 1987 graduate of The Catholic University of America where he received a bachelor's degree in English. He and his wife have three children.

Head coaching record

References

External links
 
 Buffalo profile

1965 births
Living people
Akron Zips football coaches
Alabama Crimson Tide football coaches
Arizona Wildcats football coaches
Buffalo Bulls football coaches
Kansas Jayhawks football coaches
Notre Dame Fighting Irish football coaches
Wisconsin Badgers football coaches
Catholic University of America alumni
People from Port Chester, New York